Harvey King (born 19 October 1956) is a New Zealand cricketer and cricket administrator. He played in five first-class and two List A matches for Canterbury in 1977/78.

King was educated at Timaru Boys' High School. A right-arm opening bowler, he took seven wickets bowling in tandem with Dayle Hadlee to take Canterbury to victory over Otago in the first match of the 1977-78 Shell Cup. 

He sustained severe injuries in a car crash in his early twenties, ending his first-class career. However, he continued to play Hawke Cup cricket for South Canterbury, and was a leading administrator for Canterbury and South Canterbury. In 2021 he was named patron of South Canterbury Cricket.

See also
 List of Canterbury representative cricketers

References

External links
 

1956 births
Living people
People educated at Timaru Boys' High School
New Zealand cricketers
Canterbury cricketers
People from Gore, New Zealand
New Zealand cricket administrators